The women's shot put at the 2012 IAAF World Indoor Championships took place March 10 at the Ataköy Athletics Arena.

Medalists

Records

Qualification standards

Schedule

Results

Qualification

Qualification standard 18.60 m (Q) or at least best 8 qualified.  18 athletes from 14 countries participated.  The qualification round started at 10:04 and ended at 10:49.

Final

8 athletes from 6 countries participated.  The final started at 18:11 and ended at 19:00.

References

Shot Put
Shot put at the World Athletics Indoor Championships
2012 in women's athletics